The 2019 Youth Media Awards were held by the American Library Association on January 28, 2019. The awards recognize books written for children and young adults and the authors and illustrators who create them.

May Hill Arbuthnot Honor Lecture 
The Arbuthnot Lecture recognizes an author, critic, librarian, historian, or teacher of children's literature. The 2020 lecturer is Neil Gaiman whose work creating modern comics and as a proponent of intellectual freedom was cited.

Alex Awards 

The Alex Awards are given to books written for adults which have appeal to teenagers.

American Indian Youth Literature Award 
This award, given biannually in even years, will be announced as part of the Youth Media Awards for the first time in 2020.

Asian/Pacific American Award for Literature 
This award promotes Asian/Pacific American culture in books. The picture book winner was Drawn Together by Minh Lê and illustrated by Dan Santat, the children's literature winner was Front Desk by Kelly Yang, and the Young Adult literature winner was Darius the Great is Not Okay.

Mildred L. Batchelder Award 
The Mildred L. Batchelder Award is given to children's books published in a language other than English and then translated into English for publication in the United States.

Pura Belpré Awards 
The Pura Belpré Award is given to Latinx writers and illustrators of children's books.

Caldecott Medal 
The Caldecott Medal is given to the most distinguished American picture book

Children's Literature Legacy Award 
The Children's Literature Legacy Award is given as a lifetime achievement award to an author or illustrator of children's books. The award was given for the first time under this name after being renamed from the Laura Ingalls Wilder Award. Walter Dean Myers was given the award, with Somewhere in the Darkness and Monster specifically cited.

Coretta Scott King Book Awards 
The Coretta Scott King Awards are given to African American authors and illustrators that "demonstrate an appreciation of African American culture and universal human values."

Margaret Edwards Award 
The Margaret Edwards Award is a lifetime achievement award for young adult writers. The 2019 recipient was M.T. Anderson who was cited for his work on Feed, The Astonishing Life of Octavian Nothing, Traitor to the Nation, Volume I: The Pox Party and The Astonishing Life of Octavian Nothing, Traitor to the Nation, Volume II: The Kingdom on the Waves.

Geisel Award 
The Geisel Award recognizes beginner reader books.

William C. Morris Award 
The Moriss Award is given to a first-time teen author.

Newbery Medal 
The Newbery Medal is given to the most outstanding contribution to children's literature.

Excellence in Early Learning Digital Media Award
Given for the first time in 2019, this award is given to a digital media resource for early learners. The 2019 recipient was Play and Learn Science by PBS Kids. The two honor recipients were Coral Reef by Tinybop and Lexi's World by Pop Pop Pop.

Odyssey Award
The Odyssey Award is given to the best audiobook for children or young adults.

Printz Award 
The Printz Award is given to excellence in young adult literature.

Schenider Family Book Award 
The Schnieder Family Book Award is given to a book that shows the disability experience.

Sibert Award 
The Sibert Award is given to the most distinguished informational book for children.

Stonewall Book Award
The Stonewall Book Award is given to children's and young adult books relating to the gay, lesbian, bisexual, and transgender experience.

Sydney Taylor Book Award 
The Sydney Taylor Book Award is given to children's and young adult books that portray the Jewish experience. The younger reader winner was All-of-a-Kind Family Hanukkah by Emily Jenkins, illustrated by Paul O. Zelinsky, the older reader winner was Sweep: The Story of a Girl and Her Monster by Jonathan Auxier, and the teen reader winner was What the Night Sings by Vesper Stamper.

YALSA Award for Excellence in Nonfiction for Young Adults
The YALSA Award for Excellence in Nonfiction for Young Adults was given to The Unwanted: Stories of the Syrian Refugees written and illustrated by Don Brown. Four books were given honors:  The Beloved World of Sonia Sotomayor, by Sonia Sotomayor, Boots on the Ground: America’s War in Vietnam, by Elizabeth Partridge, The Faithful Spy: Dietrich Bonhoeffer and the Plot to Kill Hitler, written and illustrated by John Hendrix, and Hey, Kiddo: How I Lost My Mother, Found My Father, and Dealt with Family Addiction, written and illustrated by Jarrett J. Krosoczka.

Reaction and Reception 
HarperCollins and Penguin-Random House each won the most recognition with 11 citations each. Forty-seven of the award winners were women, while 30 were men. The Newbery and Caldecott winners were considered surprising as they were not on many of the lists of predicted winners. The omission of Dreamers, winner of the Belpre Illustrator award, from the Caldecott was also criticised. Newbery winner Meg Medina, who serves on the advisory board of the advocacy organization We Need Diverse Books was pleased to see the diversity of the winners. Elizabeth Acevedo whose The Poet X won recognition for both the Printz and Belpre awards was "shaking" after hearing about her Printz win and was shocked at her Belpre win, "To get that honor is so special." Sophie Blackall said she was "weeping" when she learned she had won her second Caldecott Medal while visiting Myanmar.

See also 
School Library Reviews of the Winners

Notes

References 

2019 awards in the United States
Children's literary awards
American Library Association awards